George Rose (born 13 March 1983) is an Australian former professional rugby league footballer. He played for the Melbourne Storm, Manly-Warringah Sea Eagles, Sydney Roosters and the St. George Illawarra Dragons in the NRL.

Early life
Rose was born in Bathurst, New South Wales and was educated at Kelso High School. He was an exceptional student, and scored the top mark in a statewide mathematics competition.

George played his junior rugby league for the Bathurst Penguins.

Playing career
An indigenous representative prop forward, he previously played for Sydney NRL clubs the Manly-Warringah Sea Eagles (with whom he won the 2011 NRL Premiership) Melbourne Storm and Sydney Roosters.

During the round 11, 2007, match against the Melbourne Storm, Rose badly broke his leg in a tackle midway through the second half. He missed the rest of the 2007 season, including Manly's grand final appearance, and returned to play for Manly at New South Wales Cup level in 2008.

In 2008, he featured for the Indigenous Dreamtime team against the New Zealand Māori in a curtain-raiser to the opening game of the World Cup. He also featured for the Indigenous All Stars in their match against the NRL All Stars to kick off the 2010 NRL season.

Rose broke back into Manly's top side in 2009, after playing off the bench in Manly's win over Leeds in the 2009 World Club Challenge. Following a breakout year, Rose was named as the Sea Eagles Player of the Year for the 2009 season.

On 2 October 2011 Rose played from the bench in Manly's 2011 NRL Grand Final win over the New Zealand Warriors 24–10 in front of 81,988 fans at the ANZ Stadium in Sydney. Rose was placed on report for an elbow to Warriors hooker Aaron Heremaia in the 29th minute of the game and received a one match ban as a result.

In round 1 of the 2014 NRL season, Rose made his Melbourne Storm debut against his former club Manly-Warringah.

On 28 October 2014, Rose signed a one-year deal with the St George Illawarra Dragons for the 2015 season.

Rose was Awarded the Preston Campbell Medal for Man of the Match performance in the All Stars Game 2015, played at Cbus Super Stadium on the Gold Coast, 13 February 2015.

In 2017, it was revealed that Rose was playing for the Moore Park Broncos in the local Sydney Combined Competition.

Boxing Promoter

George Rose Is currently a promoter and CEO of No Limit Boxing as Australian top boxing promotion with fighters like Tszyu Brothers (Tim Tszyu and Nikita Tszyu), Paul Gallen, Sam Goodman, Liam Wilson and top Australian Boxing prospects like Olympians Harry Garside and Paulo Aokuso.

Personal life
Rose studied commerce at the University of Sydney. He currently works in media with National Indigenous Television and hosts the rugby league show "Over the Black Dot".

References

External links

2015 St. George Illawarra Dragons profile
George Rose at Manly Sea Eagles

1983 births
Living people
Australian Aboriginal rugby league team players
Gamilaraay
Indigenous All Stars players
Indigenous Australian rugby league players
Manly Warringah Sea Eagles players
Melbourne Storm players
Prime Minister's XIII players
Rugby league players from Bathurst, New South Wales
Rugby league props
St. George Illawarra Dragons players
Sydney Roosters players